Brett Jackson Goode (born November 2, 1984) is an American football long snapper. He played college football at Arkansas. Goode was signed by the Jacksonville Jaguars as an undrafted free agent in 2007. He has also played for the Green Bay Packers whom he won Super Bowl XLV with against the Pittsburgh Steelers.

Professional career

Jacksonville Jaguars
After going undrafted in the 2007 NFL Draft, Goode signed with the Jacksonville Jaguars on April 29, 2007. On August 20, 2007, he was waived by the Jaguars. Goode was signed by the Jaguars on March 5, 2008. On June 16, 2008, he was waived by the Jaguars for the second straight season.

Green Bay Packers
On September 1, 2008, Goode was signed by the Green Bay Packers after starting long snapper J. J. Jansen suffered a season-ending knee injury. He signed a two-year contract with the Packers on January 1, 2011. On October 13, 2012, Goode signed a three-year extension with the Packers. He was placed on injured reserve on December 22, 2015, after Goode tore his ACL in a game against the Oakland Raiders. On September 5, 2016, Goode re-signed with the Packers.

On August 12, 2017, the Packers re-signed Goode to a one-year contract. He was placed on injured reserve on September 25, 2017, after suffering a hamstring injury. He reached an injury settlement with the Packers the next day. He re-signed with the Packers on November 14, 2017.

Personal life
Goode married Monica Cayce (known for her fourth-place finish on The Amazing Race 9 with her then-boyfriend and now ex-husband Joseph) on November 1, 2014, where his groomsmen included teammates Tim Masthay, Aaron Rodgers and Mason Crosby.

References

External links
Green Bay Packers bio

1984 births
Living people
Players of American football from Arkansas
Sportspeople from Fort Smith, Arkansas
American football long snappers
Arkansas Razorbacks football players
Jacksonville Jaguars players
Green Bay Packers players